Mocyta is a genus of beetles belonging to the family Staphylinidae.

The species of this genus are found in Europe and Northern America.

Species:
 Mocyta amblystegii (Brundin, 1952) 
 Mocyta amplicollis (Mulsant & Rey, 1873)

References

Staphylinidae
Staphylinidae genera